A by-election was held for the Australian House of Representatives seat of Flinders on 11 November 1933. This was triggered by the resignation of United Australia Party (UAP) MP and former Prime Minister Stanley Bruce to become Australian High Commissioner to the United Kingdom.

The by-election was won by UAP candidate James Fairbairn.

Results

References

1933 elections in Australia
Victorian federal by-elections
1930s in Victoria (Australia)